Dr. Bodo Otto (17111787) was a Senior Surgeon of the Continental Army during the American Revolution. He was one of the early settlers of Philadelphia, Pennsylvania, having emigrated from the Electorate of Hanover in what is now Germany in 1755.

During the Revolution the Second Continental Congress appointed Otto to establish a military hospital in Trenton, New Jersey for the treatment of smallpox. He was present during the Battle of Long Island in 1776. He was also assigned to the Continental hospital at Valley Forge and located in the Uwchlan Meetinghouse. Later during the Revolution, Otto was put in charge of the hospitals in Yellow Springs (in what is now Chester Springs, Pennsylvania), where he and his son treated the ill soldiers from Valley Forge. Dr. Otto and his son crossed the Delaware River with General Washington and his army and surprised Hessian soldiers encamped at Trenton on the morning of December 26, 1776. He was widely respected for selflessly treating wounded and dying Hessians. There were only a smattering of casualties on the American side.

His three sons were also physicians for the Army, and assisted him as Junior Surgeon and Surgeon Mates.

Otto did not retire from his Army service until the age of 70.

Prior to the Revolution Otto publicly opposed the Stamp Act and also served on the Berks County Committee of Public Safety.

Some of his medical training he received at the University of Göttingen. Bodo used Trinity Lutheran Church in Reading as a hospital to treat wounded soldiers from the Battle of Brandywine.

Otto died in 1787 and was buried in Reading, Pennsylvania at the Trinity Lutheran Church (where he was a member) Cemetery.  Many of his surgical instruments as well as a portrait of him and his wife are in the collection of the Historical Society of Berks County in Reading.

A great grandson, William Todd Otto, a Judge from Indiana, served in Abraham Lincoln's administration as Assistant Secretary of the Interior.  According to The New York Times, Judge Otto was one of twelve men permitted at Mr. Lincoln's bedside when he died.

See also
 Bodo Otto House

References

External links
Historical & Genealogical Site
Pennsylvania historical marker

1787 deaths
1711 births
People from Berks County, Pennsylvania
German emigrants to the Thirteen Colonies
German Lutherans
Pennsylvania Dutch people
American Lutherans
18th-century American physicians
Physicians in the American Revolution
Burials in Pennsylvania
People of colonial Pennsylvania
People of colonial New Jersey
People from the Electorate of Hanover